Osmanabad Assembly constituency is one of the 288 Vidhan Sabha (legislative assembly) constituencies of Maharashtra state in western India.

Overview
Osmanabad (constituency number 242) is one of the four Vidhan Sabha constituencies located in the Osmanabad district. It covers the entire Kalamb tehsil and part of Osmanabad tehsil of this district. The number of electors in 2009 was 296,247 (male 157,571, female 138,676).

Osmanabad is part of the Osmanabad Lok Sabha constituency along with five other Vidhan Sabha segments, namely Paranda, Umarga and Tuljapur in Osmanabad district, Barshi in the Solapur district and Ausa in the Latur district.

Members of Legislative Assembly

See also
 Osmanabad

References

Assembly constituencies of Maharashtra
Osmanabad district